Christian Iddon (born 7 January 1985) is a British motorcycle racer from Stockport, England. He is the son of former racer Paul Iddon.

Career summary
After two seasons with Paul Bird Ducati, Iddon is contracted to Buildbase Suzuki for 2022, racing in the British Superbike Championship.

In 2020 Iddon was a frontrunner in the British Superbike championship, riding for VisionTrack Ducati. He finished third in the 2020 BSB championship, following a victory at Snetterton and a total of 8 podiums across the 18 races, and fourth in the 2021 season.

In 2019, he completed his fourth BSB season with Tyco BMW, alongside teammate Keith Farmer who stepped up from Superstock.

A regular in British Superbikes, Iddon has competed at a high level, winning races and championships in some of the biggest motorcycle racing championships across the world. He has raced in Supermoto, Supersport, Hillclimb and Superbike. A typically adaptable rider, Iddon has won a large amount of off-road titles including multiple British and International Supermoto championships, that rank in the double figures. Since switching to circuit racing in 2010, Iddon has ranked highly among some of the world's best modified production superbike racers, scoring podiums and finishing several seasons in the top ten of the British Superbike Championship. In 2017 Iddon finished a career high 7th overall in British Superbikes and in addition won the 2017 Rider's Cup trophy, given to the top non-showdown rider.

In November 2019, Iddon was announced as the replacement to the outgoing 2019 title-winner Scott Redding at the Be Wiser Ducati team.

Career statistics

British Superbike Championship

By year

References

External links
Rider's website
Profile on WorldSBK.com

Living people
1985 births
People from Stockport
English motorcycle racers
British Superbike Championship riders
Superbike World Championship riders
Supersport World Championship riders